Emanuel Franciszek Andruszewski (born 4 October 1955) is an English former  footballer who played for Southampton. He played at full back and centre back during the late 1970s.

Southampton
He joined Southampton as an associate schoolboy in November 1970, having played for St. George's School and represented Southampton & Hampshire Schools. Ted Bates and Lawrie McMenemy signed him firstly as an amateur, and then, in October 1973, as a professional. He graduated through the reserves, making his first team debut on 1 February 1975 in a 3–0 victory away to West Bromwich Albion in League Division 2. He had replaced Steve Mills, who had been seriously injured in a road crash. He retained his place for the rest of the 1974–75 season, in which he made sixteen appearances. The following season, Saints had signed Peter Rodrigues and Andruszewski was to make only a handful of appearances in the first team, and did not figure at all in the squad who went on to win the FA Cup on 1 May 1976.

Over the next few seasons, he was unable to establish himself as a first choice player although he did make two appearances in the quarter-finals of the European Cup Winners' Cup against Anderlecht in March 1977.

He was an uncompromising tackler and was at his best when given a particular opponent to shadow and was often brought in to the side to perform a specific man-marking task. He rarely got forward into attack, but the few goals that he did score were usually fairly special. On 5 March 1977, he scored the winner against Charlton Athletic, when he crashed a shot past the keeper after running on to a return pass from Mick Channon.

In the 1977–78 season, he was selected fairly regularly including appearing in the final 13 games as Saints finished as runners-up (to Bolton Wanderers) to gain promotion back to Division 1.

His finest game for the Saints was against Birmingham City in the Football League Cup on 29 August 1978, when he shackled Trevor Francis so well that Saints were able to notch up a 5–2 victory, which set them on the way to the League Cup final at Wembley against Nottingham Forest on 17 March 1979. Although Andruszewski had featured in several of the earlier games, he didn't even make the bench for the final.

Tampa Bay Rowdies

Andruszewski spent most of the summer of 1979 on loan to the Tampa Bay Rowdies of the NASL appearing in 16 games and was a starter in Soccer Bowl '79. Back in England he continued to make occasional appearances over the next season, before being transferred for £150,000 to Tampa Bay in May 1980. His period in the USA was not a great success and was cut short by illness.

He briefly returned to The Dell in 1982, although he made no further first-team appearances. In all he made exactly 100 appearances for Southampton's first team, scoring 3 goals.

Aldershot

In the season 1982–83, he signed for Aldershot, and then returned to the US to join the Houston Dynamos for the summer of 1984, and then the Dallas Sidekicks indoor soccer team from November 1984 to May 1985.

After football

After retiring from football, he worked for Peter Green furniture stores and in 2005 he set up his own gardening business in Eastleigh.

References

External links
 Article at Sporting Heroes
 Local newspaper article by Lawrie McMenemy
 Dallas Sidekicks career
 NASL/MISL stats
 Tampa Bay Rowdies: Manny Andruszewski
Saints Players You Have Never Heard Of!: Manny Andruszewski

1955 births
People from Eastleigh
Living people
English people of Polish descent
English footballers
Association football defenders
English Football League players
Aldershot F.C. players
Southampton F.C. players
English expatriate footballers
English expatriate sportspeople in the United States
Expatriate soccer players in the United States
Major Indoor Soccer League (1978–1992) players
North American Soccer League (1968–1984) indoor players
North American Soccer League (1968–1984) players
United Soccer League (1984–85) players
Dallas Sidekicks (original MISL) players
Houston Dynamos players
Tampa Bay Rowdies (1975–1993) players
Andover F.C. players